Polop de la Marina, or briefly Polop, is a municipality in the comarca of Marina Baixa, Alicante, Valencian Community, Spain.

History

References

External links

Town Hall of Polop de la Marina
Royal Archives of the Kingdom of Valencia
Castle of Polop

Municipalities in the Province of Alicante
Marina Baixa